Ramsinghpur is a small town in district of Rewari, Haryana, India.  It is in Bawal.  Bawal is 14 km from here.

References

Cities and towns in Rewari district